Quick was an electronic purse system available on Austrian bank cards to allow small purchases to be made without cash. The history of the Quick system goes back to 1996. Quick was discontinued on July 31, 2017.

The system was aimed at small retailers such as bakeries, cafés, drink, and parking automats (but even small discount shops such as Billa accept it) and intended for purchases of less than €400. The card was inserted into a handheld Quick reader by the merchant who enters the transaction amount for the customer. The customer then confirms the purchase by pushing a button on the keypad, the exact amount debited from the card within a few seconds.

As well as the multipurpose bank card version, anonymous cards (also smart cards) are available for the use of people without bank accounts, such as children and tourists. At ATMs, one can transfer money for free between bank cards and the Quick chip (either on a standalone smart card, or contained in the bank card).

The scheme was operated by Europay Austria and most of the Maestro cards in use contain Quick support, but new ones are not issued without it.

See also
 Octopus card
 Moneo

External links
The official Quick site (in German)
Quick, Austria’s electronic purse

Banking in Austria
Smart cards
Payment cards